The 2018–19 Penn State Nittany Lions basketball team represented Pennsylvania State University in the 2018–19 NCAA Division I men's basketball season. They were led by head coach Pat Chambers, in his eighth season with the team, and played their home games at the Bryce Jordan Center in University Park, Pennsylvania as members of the Big Ten Conference. The Lions finished the season 14–18, 7–13 in Big Ten play to finish in a three-way tie for 10th place. They lost to Minnesota in the second round of the Big Ten tournament.

Previous season
The Nittany Lions finished the 2017–18 season 26–13, 9–9 in Big Ten play to finish in a tie for sixth place. In the Big Ten tournament, they defeated Northwestern and Ohio State before losing to Purdue in the semifinals. They received a bid to the National Invitation Tournament where they defeated Temple, Notre Dame, Marquette, and Mississippi State to advance to the NIT championship where they defeated Utah to become NIT champions.

Offseason

Departures

Incoming transfers

2018 recruiting class

Roster

Coaching Staff

Schedule and results

|-
!colspan=9 style=|Exhibition

|-
!colspan=9 style=|Regular season

|-
!colspan=9 style=|Big Ten tournament

References

Penn State Nittany Lions basketball seasons
Penn State
Penn State
Penn State